Eupithecia pinata is a moth of the family Geometridae. It is found in North America (including Arizona). It was described by Samuel E. Cassino in 1925.

The forewings are deep smoky in color. The inner and outer edges of the median area are formed by two solid dark bands. The subterminal area is paler and followed by a dark, pre-apical costal blotch and two others on the outer margin.

References

Moths described in 1925
pinata
Moths of North America